is a Japanese four-panel comedy manga series written and illustrated by Haruto Hino. It was serialized on Shogakukan's online app MangaONE and Ura Sunday website from August 2015 to May 2018, with its chapters collected in seven tankōbon volumes. An anime television series adaptation by Production IMS aired from January to March 2018. The anime series was the final one to be produced by Production IMS before its bankruptcy.

Plot
20-year-old Michiru arrives in Tokyo where she will start a new job and big-city lifestyle, moving into Stella House Haruno, a women-only share house. The three other young women there - Kae, Makoto and Nao - welcome her warmly, and as they live their lives they experience a variety of Japanese alcoholic drinks, one featured per episode.

Characters

 A woman who moves from the smaller city of Okayama to experience the fashionable Tokyo lifestyle. She is always cheerful, eager to learn and work. She is still discovering alcohol.

 A clothing store employee and Makoto's older sister. She is carefree, eager to party, and often drinks to excess.

 A wedding planner, whose occupation is in sharp contrast to her personal lack of success with men. Being responsible and the house cook, she is a mother figure to the other girls, although alcohol has been shown to bring out her more free-wheeling "Sexy Dynamite Kae" personality. Her favorite drink is wine.

A university student and Nao's younger sister. In contrast to her sister she is calm and reasoned. She prefers sweet cocktails.

Media

Manga
Takunomi is written and illustrated by Haruto Hino. It was serialized on Shogakukan's online app MangaONE and Ura Sunday website from August 19, 2015 to May 25, 2018. Shogakukan collected its chapters in seven tankōbon volumes, released from December 18, 2015 to July 12, 2018.

Volume list

Anime
An anime television series adaptation directed by Tomoki Kobayashi and produced by Production IMS aired from January 11 to March 29, 2018. The series consists of 15-minute episodes, and ran for 12 episodes, sharing a time-slot with the second season of Dagashi Kashi. Shinpei Kobayashi designed the characters while Katsuhiko Takayama the screenplay. The sound company for the series was Magic Capsule and the music production was by Pony Canyon. The opening theme is "aventure bleu" by Maaya Uchida and the ending theme is "Stoic ni Detox" by Mashinomi. Sentai Filmworks have licensed the series and streamed it on Hidive.

Episode list

Note

References

External links
 

Anime series based on manga
Comedy anime and manga
Japanese webcomics
Production IMS
Sentai Filmworks
Shogakukan manga
Shōnen manga
Slice of life anime and manga
Webcomics in print
Yonkoma